Striped frog may refer to:

 Striped burrowing frog (Cyclorana alboguttata), a frog in the family Hylidae found in Australia
 Striped chorus frog (Pseudacris triseriata), a frog in the family Hylidae found in Canada and the United States
 Striped marsh frog (Limnodynastes peronii), a frog in the family Myobatrachidae native to eastern Australia
 Striped metal frog (Cacosternum striatum), a frog in the family Pyxicephalidae found in Lesotho and South Africa, and possibly Mozambique and Eswatini
 Striped robber frog (Eleutherodactylus unistrigatus), a frog in the family Leptodactylidae found in Colombia and Ecuador
 Striped rocket frog  (Litoria nasuta), a frog in the family Hylidae found in Australia and Papua New Guinea
 Striped tree frog  (Hypsiboas caingua), a frog in the family Hylidae found in Argentina, Brazil, and Paraguay
 Striped tree frog (Asia) (Polypedates leucomystax), a frog in the family Rhacophoridae found in Asia

See also

 Striped stream frog (disambiguation)

Animal common name disambiguation pages